RIN may refer to:

RIN (rapper), Renato Šimunović (born 1994), German-Croatian rapper
Rassemblement pour l'Indépendance Nationale, a former Quebec nationalist group
Relative Intensity Noise, a noise term in fiber-optic communication
Renewable Identification Number, a serial number assigned to a batch of biofuel for the purpose of tracking
RNA integrity number, a method of assessing RNA quality for biochemical applications
Royal Indian Navy, the naval force of British India
Royal Institute of Navigation, a learned society for Navigation.

See also
 Rin (disambiguation)